Yuri Ivanovich Tarasov (born 5 April 1960; died in 1999) was a Soviet Ukrainian professional football player.

Statistics for Metalist 

 Other – USSR Super Cup
 The statistics in USSR Cups and Europe is made under the scheme "Autumn-Spring" and enlisted in a year of start of tournaments

Honours
 Club records for most games played (214) and most goals scored (61) for FC Metalist Kharkiv in the Soviet Top League.
 Soviet Cup winner: 1988.
 4 games and 2 goals for FC Metalist Kharkiv in the 1988–89 European Cup Winners' Cup.

References

External links
 Career summary by KLISF

1960 births
2000 deaths
Soviet footballers
Soviet expatriate footballers
Ukrainian footballers
Expatriate footballers in Israel
FC Metalist Kharkiv players
FC Olympik Kharkiv players
Beitar Jerusalem F.C. players
FC Nyva Vinnytsia players
Soviet Top League players
Ukrainian Premier League players
Association football forwards
Soviet expatriate sportspeople in Israel
Sportspeople from Kharkiv Oblast